The 1999–2000 season was the 120th season of competitive football by Rangers.

Overview
Rangers played a total of 55 competitive matches during the 1999–2000 season. The team finished first in the Scottish Premier League and won Advocaat his second consecutive league title.

Rangers won the title by 21 points after some very consistent form throughout the season, only failing to win eight matches and losing just two. Rangers were undefeated against Celtic winning three out of the four matches.  The signing of Michael Mols proved to be very significant with the striker scoring nine goals in his first nine league matches, although he suffered a serious injury later on in the season.

In the domestic cup competitions, they were knocked out of the League Cup at the quarter-finals stage, losing 1–0 to Aberdeen. However, the team won the Scottish Cup, their 100th major honour, defeating Aberdeen 4–0.

In European competition, the team qualified for the UEFA Champions League group stages after a win over UEFA Cup holders Parma in the third qualifying round, whom Rangers has lost to the previous season en route to Parma's UEFA Cup win. They were drawn alongside Bayern Munich, PSV Eindhoven and Valencia. Rangers were unable to qualify for the next stage of the Champions League after a narrow 1–0 loss in Munich on the final match day. The game saw Michael Mols suffer a serious knee injury after attempting to avoid a collision with Oliver Khan, and he was therefore out for the rest of the season. Rangers finished third in the group and dropped into the UEFA Cup, where they drew Borussia Dortmund. Despite a convincing 2–0 win in Glasgow, Rangers lost 2–0 in Dortmund and lost the tie overall after a penalty shoot-out.

Players

Appearances

List of squad players, including number of appearances by competition

|}

Transfers

In

Out

Expendure:  £6,800,000
Income:  £9,050,000
Total loss/gain:  £2,250,000

Results
All results are written with Rangers' score first.

Scottish Premier League

UEFA Champions League

UEFA Cup

*Rangers lost the tie 3–1 on penalties

Scottish Cup

League Cup

League table

References 

Rangers F.C. seasons
Rangers
Scottish football championship-winning seasons